Amer Iqbal is a Pakistani American theoretical physicist. He is primarily known for his work in string theory and mathematical physics.

Biography 
Amer Iqbal has a Doctorate in Theoretical physics from Massachusetts Institute of Technology. He carried out his doctoral research under the supervision of Barton Zwiebach. He has held a faculty position at University of Washington and postdoctoral positions at the University of Texas at Austin and at Harvard University. He also worked as an associate professor of physics at Lahore University of Management Sciences and Abdus Salam School of Mathematical Sciences. He currently resides in the United States.

Amer Iqbal was awarded the Abdus Salam Award for physics in 2012 for his work on superstring theory and its relationship with supersymmetry and gauge theories. He was also awarded the COMSTECH Award for physics in 2020 for his work on six dimensional little strings and their geometric engineering using F-theory on elliptic Calabi-Yau threefolds.

References

External links
 

Quaid-i-Azam University alumni
Pakistani physicists
American string theorists
Living people
Pakistani educators
Pakistani scholars
Pakistani science writers
Scientists from Lahore
Academic staff of Lahore University of Management Sciences
Year of birth missing (living people)
MIT Center for Theoretical Physics alumni
Pakistani emigrants to the United States